Heinz Sandauer (1911–1979) was an Austrian composer. Sandauer worked on the film scores of twenty films between 1936 and 1958.

Selected filmography
 Harvest (1936)
 Anton the Last (1939)
 Two Happy People (1943)
 The Imaginary Invalid (1952)
 Shame on You, Brigitte! (1952)
 Arena of Death (1953)
 The Schimeck Family (1957)
 Sebastian Kneipp (1958)

References

Bibliography 
 Musiker, Naomi & Musiker, Reuben. Conductors and Composers of Popular Orchestral Music: A Biographical and Discographical Sourcebook. Routledge, 2014.

External links 
 

1911 births
1979 deaths
Austrian male composers
Austrian composers
Musicians from Vienna
20th-century Austrian composers
20th-century Austrian male musicians